This is the order of battle for the Battle of Fuentes de Oñoro, which took place on 3–6 May 1811.

French Army of Portugal
Commander-in-Chief: Marshal André Masséna

Army total: 48,198 (42,206 infantry, 4,662 cavalry, 46 guns)

II Corps

GD Jean Reynier

VI Corps

GD Louis Henri Loison

VIII Corps

GD Jean-Andoche Junot

IX Corps

GD Jean-Baptiste Drouet, Comte d'Erlon

Reserves

Anglo-Portuguese Army 
Commander-in-Chief: Lt Gen Viscount Wellington

Column Commander: Lt Gen Brent Spencer, commanding 1st & 3rd Divisions

Army total: 36,813 (33,969 infantry, 1,857 cavalry, 48 guns)

Notes

References

Peninsular War orders of battle